The name Knut was used for two tropical cyclones in the Eastern Pacific Ocean. The name was retired in the spring of 1992, and replaced with Kenneth in the 1993 season.

 Tropical Storm Knut (1981)
 Tropical Storm Knut (1987)

Pacific hurricane set index articles